The Henares is a river in Spain, tributary of the Jarama. It has its source in the Sierra Ministra, in the village of Horna, near Sigüenza, in the province of Guadalajara. Its tributaries are the Torote, the Sorbe, the  Cañamares, the Salado, the Dulce, the Aliendre, and the Bornova.

Henares in Spanish is the plural of henar 'hayfield' (derived from the Latin word faenum 'hay'), because formerly there were hay fields on the river's banks.

See also 
 List of rivers of Spain

 
Rivers of Spain
Rivers of Castilla–La Mancha
Rivers of the Community of Madrid
Guadalajara, Spain
Tributaries of the Jarama